Ray Bridwell White (August 24, 1892 – November 5, 1946) was the son of Alma White, the leader of the Pillar of Fire Church in Zarephath, New Jersey.  He was nominated to be a Bishop shortly after his mother died in 1946, but was too ill to attend the ordination ceremony and died shortly thereafter.

Biography
White was born on August 24, 1892 in Denver, Colorado, to Alma Bridwell (1862-1946) and Kent White (1860-1940). He had a brother, Arthur Kent White (1889-1981).

The church was started by his mother, Alma Bridwell White, in Denver. He attended Columbia University and graduated in 1917. Alma White died on June 26, 1946.

Ray died on November 5, 1946 in Zarephath, New Jersey and was buried in Fairmount Cemetery in Denver.

Publications

The Truth in Satire Concerning Infallible Popes, The Good Citizen, 1929.
"Eternal security" insecure: Or the heresy of "once in grace always in grace".
The legend of Manitousa and other poems, Hank and other sketches.
Doctrines and discipline of the Pillar of Fire Church. (1918) revised 1923, 1926

References

1892 births
1946 deaths
Pillar of Fire International
Burials at Fairmount Cemetery (Denver, Colorado)
Critics of the Catholic Church
American anti-communists